The Union is a fictional UK superhero team that appear in comic books published by Marvel.

The Union has both old and new superheroes within it, including British hero Union Jack and a major new character, Britannia, who leads the new team in its fight against the enemies they encounter.

The Union appeared in the crossover event called King in Black alongside other well known comic book heroes and teams, and faced off against known foes and new foes not yet fought by any Marvel superhero or team.

Comic publication history
The Union (comic) was first released in December 2020 with the first issue of the comic The Union #1. The Union was originally due to be release as part of the Empyre event, but was moved and rewritten to fit into King in Black event due to issues caused by the ongoing pandemic.

Team publication history
The Union (team) first appeared in The Union #1 as part of the King in Black crossover event.

On 29 September 2021 The Union (team) featured in The Marvels #5 alongside other marvel superheroes .

The Union (comics)

Other series (team featured)

Britannia Project (organisation)

Main & Supporting characters

The Union 
The Union was formed by the British Government as a publicity attempt to restore faith in Britain. The superhero team consists of five members; four of them representing the individual nations of the United Kingdom, and the fifth representing the UK as a whole.

Britannia

Britannia is the leader of the Union and represents the United Kingdom as a whole. She is a powerful warrior, wearing a dark and light contrasting blue outfit with a red cloak. She is seen wielding a sword and shield, as well as a trident. After being killed by a symbiote dragon, her spirit resides within Union Jack, protecting him from harm and enhancing his strength.

Kelpie

Representative of Scotland in the team. She is referred to as "an ancient water demon found living in a Scottish lake". She has the power to control water, as well as being able to transform her hands into sharp claws.

The Choir

Representative of Wales in the team.  She has black hair with a bright green strip across the top, and she is dressed in a glowing green and black contrasting outfit with a blue cloak and she wields a dagger. She is described as having "a voice that can shatter stone". During the attack on Earth by Knull, the Choir is infected by a symbiote. She is freed of Knull's control through the efforts of the Union, but later defects to work alongside Doc Croc and his team.

Snakes

Representative of Northern Ireland in the team. Snakes is a sentient collection of snakes formed together in the shape of a human. Described as having "the strength of ten men".

Union Jack

Representative of England in the team. He is the only pre-existing character in the Union, and the latest man to bear the name of a character who first appeared in The Invaders.

Bulldog

Joining the team as a replacement for Britannia after her death, Bulldog is a short man who displays super-strength and enhanced agility. He wears a red and grey jumpsuit and black boots.

Supporting Characters

Allies

 Selwlyn James (Government Minister with special responsibility for super heroes), the head of the Britannia Project, and the Union's government liaison. Later revealed to be ex-supervillain The Sponge Steve Darwin (Leader of the Britannia Project)

Enemies
 Knull
 Doc Croc (Croker Dyle)
 The Sponge (Selwlyn James) 
 Skreem (The Choir) (supervillain / superhero) (introduced in The Union #1) (first full appearance in The Union #4)
 Volcana (introduced in The Union #4)
 Lady Shimmering Lights (introduced in The Union #4)
 Craig the cybernetically enhanced corgi (introduced in The Union #4)
Races and species (featured)
 Humans
 Symbiotes/Klyntar
 Dogs (Robot)

Reactions 

Roster
The Union (marvel team) roster has gone through a number of changes, this includes members leaving and joining the team and being present in a spirit form.

(Current member are indicated in bold)                  (Leaders are highlighted in gold)

Current Roster

See also 
Marvel Lists
List of Marvel superhero teams
 List of Marvel Comics characters
The Union (Members) Comics
 Union Jack (Marvel Comics)

References

External links
 Marvel
The Union (Marvel Comic Series)
The Union (Marvel Comic Series)                    (trade paperback)
The Marvels #5 (Marvel Comic)

Footnotes 

Marvel Comics superhero teams
Marvel Comics superheroes
United Kingdom-themed superheroes
British superheroes